Humayun Farhat (born 24 January 1981) is a Pakistani cricket coach and former cricketer who played for the Pakistan national cricket team in 2001 as a wicket-keeper in his only Test cricket match. He is one of two brothers to have played Test cricket for Pakistan.

Personal life
His brother Imran Farhat has also played international cricket for Pakistan.

Cricket career
He played one Test match, in March 2001 against New Zealand and five One Day International matches for Pakistan. He is the only wicketkeeper to have played Test cricket who has not recorded a single dismissal.

He played in five One Day Internationals and a one test match for Pakistan. Due to the presence of wicketkeepers like Moin Khan and Rashid Latif, he could not really cement his place in the national team. In 2007, he participated in the unofficial Indian Cricket League (ICL), representing Lahore Badshahs. His participation in ICL meant that he was banned from the Pakistan team for life. The rise of Kamran Akmal as the first-choice wicket-keeper in the late 2000s further dented his chances in the national team.

He retired from domestic cricket after the 2014–15 season, having played more than a hundred List A and first-class matches.

Coaching career
In August 2021, for the 2021-22 domestic season, he was appointed fielding coach to the Central Punjab's first XI team and was also appointed head coach to its Under-19 and Under-16 squads.

In November 2022, he began to undertake level 3 coaching courses with the PCB.

References

External links 
 

1981 births
Living people
Pakistan One Day International cricketers
Pakistan Test cricketers
ICL Pakistan XI cricketers
Lahore Badshahs cricketers
Pakistani cricketers
Lahore City cricketers
Lahore Whites cricketers
Lahore Blues cricketers
Lahore Eagles cricketers
Allied Bank Limited cricketers
Sui Northern Gas Pipelines Limited cricketers
Punjab (Pakistan) cricketers
Habib Bank Limited cricketers
Cricketers from Lahore
Wicket-keepers
People from Lahore
Pakistani cricket coaches